Cabus is a civil parish in the Wyre district of Lancashire, England.  It contains seven listed buildings that are recorded in the National Heritage List for England.  All the listed buildings are designated at Grade II, the lowest of the three grades, which is applied to "buildings of national importance and special interest".  The parish includes the northern part of the town of Garstang and is otherwise mainly rural.  Its listed buildings consist of a medieval cross, two farmhouses, a former toll house, a public house, a boundary stone, and a milestone.


Buildings

References

Citations

Sources

Lists of listed buildings in Lancashire
Buildings and structures in the Borough of Wyre